Beach volleyball was introduced at the 2014 Summer Youth Olympics in Nanjing, China.

Medal table
As of the 2018 Summer Youth Olympics.

Boys' tournament

Team appearances

Girls' tournament

Team appearances

References

 
Sports at the Summer Youth Olympics